Hendri Satriadi (born 3 May 1992 in Enrekang) is an Indonesian professional footballer who plays as a winger for Liga 2 club Persijap Jepara.

Club career

Persegres Gresik
He made his professional debut against Persela Lamongan in the first week of the 2016 Indonesia Soccer Championship A.

References

External links
 Hendri Satriadi at Soccerway
 Hendri Satriadi at Liga Indonesia

Indonesian footballers
1992 births
Living people
Bontang F.C. players
Persiba Balikpapan players
Persijap Jepara players
PSIM Yogyakarta players
Liga 2 (Indonesia) players
Sportspeople from South Sulawesi
Association football midfielders